This is a list of some of the most notable films produced in Cinema of Germany in the 2000s.

For an alphabetical list of articles on German films see :Category:2000s German films.

2000

2001

2002

2003

2004

2005

2006

2007

2008

2009

2000s
Films
German